The Silawat, also known as Sangtarash (both ), are a Muslim community from the Marwar region of the state of Rajasthan in India. They are also present in the province of Sindh in Pakistan, where they are known as Gazdar.

The related Hindu Silawats are found in Madhya Pradesh where they migrated to from Marwar.

History and origin
The Silawat were a community historically associated with the occupation of stonemasons and builders. The word Silawat is a corruption of the Sanskrit , literally signifying a follower of the Hindu god Shilp-shastra, who is traditionally associated with the art of architecture. They were also known by the name Sootardhar from the Sanskrit  meaning a thread, which they kept for measurements.

The Silawat have two major divisions – the Mertia and the Nagauri – so called after the towns of Merta and Nagaur. But there are also groups such as the Khalji and Behlim, claim Turkic ancestry while Sayyid claim Arabian ancestry. This possibly reflects the fact that the Silawat are of a heterogeneous origin, incorporating a number of groups who took to the profession of stonemasons. The community is now bound by the rules of endogamy, and there is also no intermarriage with non-Silawats.

Clan structure

Mertia Godwad Silawat
The Mertia Godwad Silawat have the following clans:

 Agwan
 Behlim
 Tajik
 Khalji
 Sayyid
 Balkhi
 Chauhan
 Sisodia
 Solanki
 Bargujar
 Kotwal
 Hansoria

The Agwan, Behlim, Tajik, Khalji, Sayyid, Balkhi gotras claim descent from Muslim immigrants; the Chauhan, Sisodia, Solanki, Bargujar, and Kotwal claim descent from well-known Rajput tribes; Hansor is a village near Merta.

Nagauri Silawat
The Nagauri Silawat have the following subdivisions:
 Gesawat
 Khatri
 Bhatta
 Chauhan
 Gaur
 Tonwar
 Rander
 Sisodhia
 Sisodiya
 Gour
 Khichi
 Behlim
 Bhati
 Tanwar
 Gahlot
 Rathod
 Sheikh
 Solanki

Religion and customs
The Silawat are a Sunni Hanafi Sufism Muslim community, with many particular customs, like the making of joyful public announcement by a common man or woman through beating a dish with a spoon or something loudly for making huge sound that can be heard publicly. In Rajasthan, they speak the Marwari dialect of Rajasthani. Most educated members of the community are also conversant in Urdu. In Sindh, although the community still speaks Marwari, most Silawat now also speak Sindhi, Urdu and English.

The Silawat in India are a strictly endogamous community, practising mainly parallel cousin marriage. They also tend to occupy distinct neighbourhoods in the towns and cities they live in. Each of their settlement also contains an informal caste council, known as a biradari panchayat, which acted as instrument of social control. The Silawat have now set up an India-wide caste association known as the Silawat Anjuman. This acts mainly as a community welfare association.

Distribution
In Rajasthan, the Silawat are an urban-based community, found mainly in the cities of Jaipur, Jodhpur, Sikar, Jhunjhunu, Nagaur and Churu in Rajasthan and Ahmednagar in Maharashtra.

In Sindh, the Silawat are concentrated in the cities of Karachi and Hyderabad. The city of Hyderabad is a particular stronghold of this community. Muhammad Hashim Gazdar, a former Mayor of Karachi belonged to the Silawat community. The neighbourhood of Gazdarabad (formerly Ranchore Lines) is named after the community.

See also
 Tulsiram Silawat
 Zakir Hussain Gesawat
 Shama Sikander Gesawat
 Sindhi-Sipahi

References

Social groups of Rajasthan
Muslim communities of India
Muslim communities of Rajasthan
Social groups of Pakistan
Social groups of Sindh